Hyperlais dulcinalis is a species of moth in the family Crambidae described by Georg Friedrich Treitschke in 1835. It is found in Italy, Croatia, Hungary, Romania, Bulgaria, the Republic of Macedonia, Greece, Turkey and Russia.

The wingspan is 15–17 mm. Adults are on wing from May to August in one generation per year.

References

Moths described in 1835
Cybalomiinae
Moths of Europe
Moths of Asia